The Greek Motorway A64, often referred to as the Hymettus Ring Road is a branch of the main A6 route in the Attiki Odos motorway network. It is named after the Hymettus mountain range it partly encircles.

Serving parts of eastern Athens, it is also expected to be extended further southwards following the Hymettus to Vouliagmeni, and further eastwards towards Rafina.

History 

On 4 December 2015, the Greek government proposed to renumber the A64 as the A62: In practice, the renumbering did not take place, because road signs still show the motorway as the A64.

Exit list 

Source: Attiki Odos, Motorway Exitlists

References

External links
 

64
Roads in Attica